Susan Pamela Watters (born June 8, 1958) is an American attorney and jurist serving as a United States district judge of the United States District Court for the District of Montana. She is the first female judge to serve in the District of Montana.

Early life and education

Watters was born in 1958, in Billings, Montana. She earned a Bachelor of Arts degree in 1980 from Eastern Montana College. She then received a Juris Doctor in 1988 from the University of Montana School of Law.

Career 
From 1988 to 1989, she served as a law clerk to two different judges on the Thirteenth Judicial District Court of Montana. From 1989 to 1995, she served as a Deputy County Attorney in Yellowstone County, Montana. From 1995 to 1996 she was a sole practitioner focusing on criminal defense. From 1996 to 1998, she practiced both civil and criminal litigation at the law firm of Hendrickson, Everson, Noennig & Woodward, P.C. in Billings, Montana. From 1998 to 2013, she served as a judge of the Thirteenth Judicial District Court of Montana.

Federal judicial service

On May 23, 2013, President Barack Obama nominated Watters to serve as a United States District Judge of the United States District Court for the District of Montana, to the seat vacated by Judge Richard F. Cebull, who took senior status on March 18, 2013. Her nomination was reported by the  Senate Judiciary Committee on September 19, 2013. Cloture was invoked on her nomination on December 12, 2013 by a 58–39 vote. She was confirmed later that day by a 77–19 vote. She received her judicial commission on December 18, 2013.

Personal life 
Watters was previously known as Susan Pamela Dunn, Susan Pamela Elsberry and Susan Pamela Klein.

See also
List of first women lawyers and judges in Montana

References

External links

1958 births
Living people
American women lawyers
Judges of the United States District Court for the District of Montana
Politicians from Billings, Montana
Montana state court judges
Montana State University Billings alumni
University of Montana alumni
United States district court judges appointed by Barack Obama
21st-century American judges
21st-century American women judges